Rubus particularis is a rare North American species of brambles in the rose family. It has been found only in the state of West Virginia in the eastern United States.

The genetics of Rubus is extremely complex, so that it is difficult to decide on which groups should be recognized as species. There are many rare species with limited ranges such as this. Further study is suggested to clarify the taxonomy.

References

particularis
Plants described in 1947
Flora of West Virginia
Flora without expected TNC conservation status